Yıldıray Baştürk (born 24 December 1978) is a retired professional footballer who played as an attacking midfielder.

Born in Germany, he was capped 49 times for the Turkey national football team, representing the team at the 2002 FIFA World Cup where it finished in third place. In the same year he also appeared for Bayer 04 Leverkusen in the 2002 UEFA Champions League Final.  Baştürk also played for Wattenscheid 09, VfL Bochum, Hertha BSC, VfB Stuttgart and English club Blackburn Rovers.

Club career

Early years, Bochum and Bayer
The son of a miner, Baştürk began his football career at Sportfreunde Wanne-Eickel. As a teenager Baştürk played for SG Wattenscheid 09, and his breakthrough in the Bundesliga came with city rivals VfL Bochum, for whom he even played in the UEFA Cup. After the 2001 transfer to Bayer 04 Leverkusen, Baştürk was part of a team that finished second in the league, the DFB-Pokal and the 2002 UEFA Champions League Final in the 2001–02 season. Due to his role in Bayer's success and Turkey's third-place finish at the 2002 FIFA World Cup, Baştürk finished ninth in the voting for the 2002 Ballon d'Or.

Hertha and Stuttgart
In July 2004 he was transferred to Hertha BSC, where he remained until 2007 when his contract expired. Baştürk agreed to join German champions VfB Stuttgart on a Bosman transfer on 28 May 2007 for the start of the 2007–08 season.

Blackburn Rovers
On 27 January 2010, it was announced that Baştürk had agreed to join Blackburn Rovers from Stuttgart until the end of the season on a free transfer, after his contract with Stuttgart was terminated. Baştürk was handed his first start for Blackburn in the Premier League when he started against Wolverhampton Wanderers on 24 April 2010 at Molineux, however he was substituted at half-time. Baştürk was not offered a contract extension by Rovers. The following year he was a free agent and he finally announced his retirement in May 2011.

International career
In 2002, Baştürk played in the 2002 FIFA World Cup, where the Turkish team came third. He amassed 49 caps and scored two goals for Turkey. However, after he was left out of Turkey's 23-man squad for Euro 2008, he said he would never play for the national team as long as Fatih Terim remains as the coach.

Career statistics

International

International goals
Scores and results list Turkey's goal tally first, score column indicates score after each Baştürk goal.

Honours
Bayer Leverkusen
 UEFA Champions League: Runner-up 2001–02

Turkey
 FIFA World Cup: Third place 2002
 FIFA Confederations Cup: Third place 2003

References

External links
 
 Leverkusen who's who 
 
 
 

1978 births
Living people
German people of Turkish descent
German expatriate sportspeople in England
Turkish expatriate sportspeople in England
Turkish footballers
Turkish expatriate footballers
Turkey under-21 international footballers
Turkey international footballers
Citizens of Turkey through descent
SG Wattenscheid 09 players
VfL Bochum players
Bayer 04 Leverkusen players
Hertha BSC players
VfB Stuttgart players
Blackburn Rovers F.C. players
Bundesliga players
2. Bundesliga players
Premier League players
German footballers
Mediterranean Games silver medalists for Turkey
Competitors at the 1997 Mediterranean Games
2002 FIFA World Cup players
2003 FIFA Confederations Cup players
People from Herne, North Rhine-Westphalia
Sportspeople from Arnsberg (region)
Expatriate footballers in England
Association football midfielders
Footballers from North Rhine-Westphalia
Mediterranean Games medalists in football